Novoklyuchevo (Yañı Klyuçevo; , Šade Šogerten) is a rural locality (a village) in Mishkinsky Selsoviet, Mishkinsky District, Bashkortostan, Russia. The population was 154 as of 2010. There are 2 streets.

Geography 
Novoklyuchevo is located 17 km northwest of Mishkino (the district's administrative centre) by road. Malye Shady is the nearest rural locality.

References 

Rural localities in Mishkinsky District